This article is a list of diseases of dahlia (Dahlia sp.).

Bacterial diseases

Fungal diseases

Viral diseases

References
Common Names of Diseases, The American Phytopathological Society

Dahlia
Dahlia